Manhattan Moods is an album by pianist McCoy Tyner and vibraphonist Bobby Hutcherson released on the Blue Note label in 1994. It was recorded in December 1993 and features nine duet performances by Hutcherson and Tyner.

Reception
The Allmusic review by Scott Yanow states that "It is not too surprising that they blend together quite well for both remain advanced improvisers who are tied to the hard bop/modal tradition".

Track listing 
 "Manhattan Moods" - 8:38
 "Blue Monk" (Monk) - 7:56
 "Dearly Beloved" (Kern, Mercer) - 6:47
 "I Loves You, Porgy" (Gershwin, Gershwin, Heyward) - 3:47
 "Isn't This My Sound Around Me" (Hutcherson) - 6:52
 "Soul Eyes" (Waldron) - 5:58
 "Travelin' Blues" - 4:47
 "Rosie" (Hutcherson) - 5:51
 "For Heaven's Sake" (Elise Bretton, Sherman Edwards, Donald Meyer) - 6:41
All compositions by McCoy Tyner except as indicated
 Recorded in NYC, December 3 & 4, 1993

Personnel 
 McCoy Tyner - piano
 Bobby Hutcherson - vibes, marimba

References 

McCoy Tyner albums
Bobby Hutcherson albums
1994 albums
albums produced by Michael Cuscuna
Blue Note Records albums